AFSCME Council 31 is the Illinois state chapter of the American Federation of State, County and Municipal Employees (AFSCME), a union of public service workers in the public, private and non-profit sectors. AFSCME Council 31 has "100,000 active and retired members", including "approximately 40,000 state employees working in more than 50 departments, authorities, boards, and commissions under the authority of the Governor."

History

1930s 
During the Great Depression, a group of workers in Wisconsin created a group "to protect their jobs and the public services they provided". The organization that grew out of the group became AFSCME. In 1936, the American Federation of Labor granted a charter to AFSCME.

1940s 
The first AFSCME local union in Illinois was formed in 1942. It had 20 members.

1960s 
By the 1960s, AFSCME had more than 240,000 members nationwide.

1970s 
In 1973, Illinois Governor Daniel Walker signed an executive order recognizing the collective bargaining rights of public sector workers. Walker stated his intent to keep "patronage out of state government", encourage qualified people to join state government and make the serving of this state's citizens a professional career."

1980s 
In 1983, Republican Governor Jim Thompson signed the Illinois Public Labor Relations Act, enshrining the collective bargaining rights of public employees into state law. The number of AFSCME members in Illinois soon increased from 40,000 to 60,000.

Political action 
On its website, AFSCME Council 31 encourages its members to politically organize: "Unions can never hope to match the hundreds of millions of dollars big business pours into every election. But working people have superior numbers, so they can get out in the streets and work for candidates."

Protests 
The following table documents protests by members of AFSCME Council 31 and its local organizations:

Illinois political issues

State budget

Arbitration – 150 layoffs 
During the Illinois state budget crisis in 2015, Governor Bruce Rauner initiated layoffs of around 150 state workers. The issue went before an arbitration panel, which sided with Rauner's decision. As a reaction to the arbitrator's decision, both the state and AFSCME Council 31 filed lawsuits. The arbitrator based his decision on the argument that the governor was within his rights to make the layoffs. The state and the nation's largest union of public employees will head to court over an arbitrator's decision that Illinois Gov. Bruce Rauner was within his rights to order the layoffs of more than 150 state workers last year.

The state filed a suit before a Sangamon County, Illinois judge to uphold the arbitrator's ruling. AFSCME Council 31 filed a counter-claim asking for the ruling to be vacated.

According to Crain's Chicago Business, "In response to a grievance by the union, the arbitrator ruled that the union failed to prove that the Rauner administration acted improperly or violated contract language governing layoffs. The arbitrator said the administration had the right to exercise broad powers to deal with the state budget crisis."

Standoff with Governor Bruce Rauner 
In early 2015, Governor Bruce Rauner and AFSCME Council 31 began negotiating a new contract for state employees represented by AFSCME. In January 2016, Rauner broke off talks and walked away from negotiations. AFSCME sought to restart negotiations, but Rauner refused. As of April 2017, the issues between the two parties were not resolved, with litigation pending.

Litigation

State v. American Federation of State, County & Municipal Employees, Council 31 
In 2008, AFSCME Council 31 and the state of Illinois agreed on a multi-year contract that covered members' wages, hours, and employment conditions. The contract went from September 5, 2008 to June 30, 2012. One provision of the contract called for a wage increase on January 1, 2009, and then every July 1 and January 1 through the end of the contract. The wage increase amounted to 15.25 percent through the overall life of the contract.

During the Illinois budget crisis, the state could not afford the increase scheduled to go into effect on July 1, 2011. AFSCME Council 31 sued in the circuit court of Cook County. AFSCME won the suit at the trial level. The state appealed and lost at the appellate court. The case was then brought before the Illinois Supreme Court. The court held that the arbitration award violated Illinois public policy, and reversed the judgments that AFSCME Council 31 had won at the appellate and trial court levels.

References

External links
 AFSCME Council 31 website
 AFSCME Contract Changes 7/1/2012 through 6/30/2015, State of Illinois

AFL–CIO
Public sector trade unions
Trade unions in Illinois
1936 establishments in Illinois